"Science & Faith" is a song by Irish pop rock band the Script, from their second studio album, of the same name. The song was released as the fourth single on 30 May 2011. It was written and produced by Danny O'Donoghue and Mark Sheehan. A music video to accompany the release of "Science & Faith" was first released onto YouTube on 6 June 2011 at a total length of three minutes and fifty seconds.

Track listing

Chart performance

Release history

References

2011 singles
The Script songs
2010 songs
Songs written by Danny O'Donoghue
Songs written by Mark Sheehan
Phonogenic Records singles
Epic Records singles